The 1986 South American Cross Country Championships took place on May 4, 1986.  The races were held in San Carlos de Bariloche, Argentina.

Complete results, results for junior and youth competitions, and medal winners were published.

Medallists

Race results

Senior men's race (12 km)

Junior (U20) men's race (8 km)

Senior women's race (8 km)

Junior (U20) women's race (6 km)

Medal table (unofficial)

Participation
According to an unofficial count, 28 athletes from 4 countries participated.

 (12)
 (12)
 Perú (1)
 (3)

See also
 1986 in athletics (track and field)

References

External links
 GBRathletics

South American Cross Country Championships
South American Cross Country Championships
South American Cross Country Championships
South American Cross Country Championships
1986 in South American sport
Cross country running in Argentina
May 1986 sports events in South America